Alvin Kelly may refer to:

 Alvin "Shipwreck" Kelly (1893–1952), American pole-sitter
 Alvin Andrew Kelly (1951–2008), American serial killer